Michael Webb (born 1937) is an English architect. He was a founding member of the 1960s Archigram Group.

Biography 
Webb was born in Henley-on-Thames and studied architecture at the Regent Street Polytechnic in London, taking seventeen years to complete a five-year curriculum.

He was a founding member of the 1960s Archigram Group, a collection of six young radical architects. They used a magazine format, Archigram inflatable structures, clothing-like environments, bright colors and cartoon-like drawing techniques.

Webb moved to the United States in 1965 to teach at Virginia Tech, and has since taught architecture at the Rhode Island School of Design, NJIT, Columbia University, Barnard College, Cooper Union, University at Buffalo, Pratt Institute and Princeton University.

Webb taught a summer semester in Barcelona, Spain to University at Buffalo Master of Architecture students along with Professor Bonnie Ott in the summer of 2001.

He has also put on exhibitions in Europe, Asia, and North America. His latest exhibition, Two Journeys, opened in the fall semester, giving  Webb an opportunity for students to learn about him and his work. The exhibit was mounted and read like the pages of a book. It centered on two main themes: a train of thought deriving from the Reyner Banham article A Home is not a House (1965) and a study of linear perspective projection. His monograph Michael Webb: Two Journeys  Lars Muller Publishers.

Webb is married to his archivist and technologist, Nancy McCoy.  Though retired, he continues to present at Schools of Architecture around the world. Michael and Nancy live in Rhode Island.

References

External links
Two Journeys The Lifetime Projects of Michael Spider Webb
Design Museum: Archigram
Cook, Peter. "Two Journeys reflects on Michael Webb’s jack-of-all-trades career" (October 19, 2018). The Architect's Newspaper. Retrieved October 24, 2018.
Cushicle and Suitaloon. Hidden Architecture. (4/3/17) http://www.hiddenarchitecture.net/2017/03/cushicle-and-suitaloon.html
Archigram. Visual Conversation on Urban Features. (4/3/17) http://www.hiddenarchitecture.net/2017/03/cushicle-and-suitaloon.html
The Archigram Archival Project: http://archigram.westminster.ac.uk/

20th-century English architects
1937 births
Living people
People from Henley-on-Thames
Architects from Oxfordshire
University at Buffalo faculty